John Borlase or Borlace may refer to:

John Borlase (high sheriff) (died 1593), High Sheriff of Buckinghamshire 
Sir John Borlase (1576–1648), Lord Justice of Ireland, 1641–43 
Sir John Borlase, 1st Baronet (1619–1672), English Member of Parliament for Chipping Wycombe, 1661–73
John Borlase (died 1681), MP for Great Marlow 1679 and 1681
Sir John Borlase, 2nd Baronet (1642–1689), English Member of Parliament for Chipping Wycombe, 1673–85, and Great Marlow, 1685–89
John Borlase (1667–1754), English Member of Parliament for St Ives (UK Parliament constituency), 1705–10

See also
John Borlase Warren (1753–1822), English admiral, politician and diplomat
Borlase (disambiguation)